Victor Crowley (also known as Hatchet IV) is a 2017 American slasher comedy film written and directed by Adam Green. It is the fourth installment in Green's Hatchet film series, and a sequel to Hatchet III. Kane Hodder returns to the role of the titular killer Victor Crowley. Critical reaction for the film was generally mixed.

Plot
A decade after the events of the first three films, survivor of the Honey Island Swamp massacre Andrew Yong is told by his publicist Kathleen that he has been offered a special interview for a true-crime TV series, but that that the producers have insisted that his interview take place in the Honey Island Swamp. Andrew initially refuses to go due to his trauma from his experience with Victor Crowler, but is convinced when Kathleen tells him they have offered him $600,000, and she got them to go up to $1,000,000.

Andrew and Kathleen head out on a private charter plane, where Andrew learns that his interview will be hosted by his ex-wife Sabrina and her crew: audio technician Austin, his videographer girlfriend Casey, makeup artist Jay, and production assistant Zach. Suddenly, one of the plane's engines explodes during flight, and Jay and Zach are killed as the plane starts plummeting to the ground.

Meanwhile at the swamp, Chloe, her boyfriend Alex, and her best friend Rose are preparing to film a trailer for a movie they are creating based on the Crowley massacre, alongside eccentric swamp tour guide/local actor Dillon. For the sake of research, Rose begins searching YouTube for videos of people attempting to recite the voodoo curse that originally brought Crowley back to life, when Zach's charred corpse suddenly flies from the plane and lands in front of them. Rose and Dillion overhear the plane crashing, and so go off to investigate while Alex stays behind to calm Chloe down. However, Rose drops her phone while it is playing videos of people trying to recite the curse, and fails to realise.

At the plane wreckage, Dillon and Rose find that everyone aside from Jay, Zach and the pilots have managed to survive the crash, but that Casey is trapped under the seats and has water slowly rising around her due to the plane being partially submerged in the swamp. Meanwhile, Rose's phone autoplays a video of Reverend Zombie reciting the voodoo curse, and Victor Crowley is resurrected from the swamp, following which he kills Alex. Chloe flees and nearly makes it to the plane wreckage, but is severely wounded by Crowley, who then disappears into the fog.

With the survivors having witnessed the attack, Kathleen begins to suffer from a panic attack and flees the plane. Austin attempts to stop her, but he and Kathleen are both killed by Crowley, who then finishes Chloe off and attacks the plane, making it sink further and causing Casey to drown.

As Dillon locks himself in the pilot's cabin, hoping to radio for help, Andrew, Sabrina and Rose all flee in separate directions. Sabrina tries to escape on Dillon's boat, but Crowley appears and kills her. Meanwhile, Dillon manages to get the plane's engine working, and he, Andrew and Rose have a standoff with Crowley beside the plane, which sees Dillon sacrificing himself by tackling Crowley into the plane turbine, shredding them both to pieces.

Marybeth Dunston watches a news report on the crash and the discovery of several mutilated bodies. Realizing Crowley has returned, she grabs a shotgun, saying "I've been waiting for you, motherfucker."

Cast

Production

In November 2015, reports emerged that a fourth entry in the Hatchet series was in development. Simultaneously, various outlets alleged that a New Nightmare-esque premise was proposed by series creator Adam Green, but was rejected by the studio. However, Dread Central debunked these claims and instead revealed that Green opted not to move forward with the pitch. Green would later become disenchanted in continuing the franchise and was adamant there wouldn't be another installment. It wasn't until George A. Romero convinced Green to finally make the film at the Rock and Shock convention. Green immediately began work on the script, under the title Arwen's Fancy Dinner.

Principal photography began in secret under the working title Arwen's Revenge. Production spanned eleven days, while an entire day of filming was lost due to a set collapsing. Cast members Kane Hodder, Parry Shen, Laura Ortiz, Dave Sheridan, and Brian Quinn were officially revealed in August 2017.

In July 2017, it was announced that an official '10th Anniversary Event' screening of the original Hatchet film would be playing at the FrightFest Film Festival of 2017, featuring newly released footage. The same event, which took place on August 22, 2017 in Los Angeles, brought forth the announcement that it was actually the premiere of a secretly filmed Hatchet sequel titled Victor Crowley. Green said on the matter, "I couldn't be happier to partner with Dark Sky Films and bring Victor Crowley back to horror fans around the world. Resurrecting the series for its tenth anniversary was our way of saying thank you to everyone in The Hatchet Army and beyond who have supported this series since its inception. This bloodbath is for all of you."

Release

Theatrical
Victor Crowley debuted on August 22, 2017 in Los Angeles, California The film began screening in select theatres across the United States on October 5, 2017 on special one night events featuring Adam Green collectively known as the "Victor Crowley Road Show".

Home media
The film was released on blu-ray and DVD on February 6, 2018.

Reception

On Rotten Tomatoes, Victor Crowley holds an approval rating of 67% based on 15 reviews, with an average rating of 6.7/10.

The film was met with mixed reviews. Steve Barton of Dread Central awarded the film a quality rating of 4 out of 5, stating that "Victor Crowley is a smartly written, outrageously funny, and incredibly gory affair that's nothing short of a gift for slasher fans who appreciate their films wrapped in viscera with gallons of blood to spare." JoBlo.com said of the film "VICTOR CROWLEY may be the best of the sequels to HATCHET, perhaps the best in the series." Kalyn Corrigan of Bloody Disgusting called it "the Gory Slasher Film You're Craving!", while critiquing "Sure, they spend a little too much time on the plane, and it would've been nice to see some of the more human characters last a bit longer during the runtime, but... in all honesty, it's just nice to have a series in the same iconic style that we can count on to carry us through the years of big studio films and over produced predictable cash grabs." Alternately, Brad Miska also reviewing for Bloody Disgusting said "While Hatchet has since become an iconic franchise, none of the sequels have been able to recreate the magic of the first film. The latest, Victor Crowley, is easily the worst of the bunch."

Potential sequel
In October 2019, Danielle Harris revealed that two more films were planned by the studio, with the intention of shooting both back-to-back. In May 2020, Green said that a fifth film was a "safe bet" due to the financial success of Victor Crowley.

References

External links
 

2017 films
2010s comedy horror films
2017 horror films
2017 independent films
2010s serial killer films
2010s slasher films
American independent films
American sequel films
American slasher films
American splatter films
Slasher comedy films
Films set in Louisiana
Films shot in New Orleans
Hatchet (film series)
Parodies of horror
2017 comedy films
2010s English-language films
Films directed by Adam Green
2010s American films